The 1st Rhode Island Regiment (also known as Varnum's Regiment, the 9th Continental Regiment, the Black Regiment, the Rhode Island Regiment, and Olney's Battalion) was a regiment in the  Continental Army raised in Rhode Island during the American Revolutionary War (1775–83). It was one of the few units in the Continental Army to serve through the entire war, from the siege of Boston to the disbanding of the Continental Army on November 3, 1783.

The unit went through several reorganizations and name changes, like most regiments of the Continental Army. It became known as the "Black Regiment" because it was composed mostly of black enlistees. However, there were also some Native Americans. It is regarded by some as the first black military unit, because all the enlistees were non-white.

Regimental history

Viburnum's Regiment (1775)
The 1st Rhode Island was initially formed by the Colonial government before being taken into the Continental army. The revolutionary Rhode Island Assembly authorized the regiment on 6 May 1775 as part of the Rhode Island Army of Observation. The regiment was organized on 8 May 1775 under Colonel James Mitchell Varnum, and was therefore often known as "Varnum's Regiment."  It originally consisted of eight companies of volunteers from Kent and Kings Counties.

Varnum marched the regiment to Roxbury, Massachusetts in June 1775, where it took part in the siege of Boston as part of the Army of Observation. It was adopted into the Continental Army by act of Congress on 14 June 1775. It was expanded to ten companies on 28 June, and was assigned to General Nathanael Greene's Brigade in General George Washington's Main Army on 28 July.  Greene's Brigade was encamped at Prospect Hill in Somerville.   General Washington officially took command of the Continental Army upon his arrival in Cambridge, Massachusetts on 3 July 1775.

The soldiers of Varnum's Regiment had enlisted until the end of 1775, like all others in the Continental Army, and the Regiment was discharged on December 31, along with the remainder of the Army.

9th Continental Regiment (1776)
The Continental Army was completely reorganized at the beginning of 1776, with many regiments receiving new names and others being disbanded.  Enlistments were for one year. Varnum's Regiment was reorganized with eight companies on 1 January 1776 and re-designated as the 9th Continental Regiment.  Under Colonel Varnum, the regiment remained near Boston until the British evacuated the city in March. It was then ordered to Long Island and took part in the disastrous New York and New Jersey campaign, including the Battle of Long Island and the Battle of Harlem Heights, retreating from New York with the Main Army. The Continental Army was reorganized at the end of the year, as was the case in 1775, but soldiers were now given the option of enlisting for "three years or the war", unlike the previous practice of enlisting only until the end of the year.

1st Rhode Island Regiment (1777–80)
The Continental Army was reorganized once again in 1777, and the 9th Continental Regiment was re-designated as the 1st Rhode Island Regiment. Colonel Varnum was promoted to brigadier general on February 27, 1777, and was succeeded by Colonel Christopher Greene, a distant cousin of General Nathanael Greene. Under Colonel Greene, the regiment, along with the 2nd Rhode Island Regiment, successfully defended Fort Mercer at the Battle of Red Bank on 22 October 1777 against an assault by 2,000 Hessians.

The regiment spent the winter of 1777 to 1778 at Valley Forge near Philadelphia.  It endured the hardships of hunger, disease and exposure to cold along with other units of the Continental Army.  In early 1778 the regiment, along with the 2nd Rhode Island, returned to Rhode Island to prepare for an upcoming expedition to dislodge British and Hessian forces occupying the city of Newport.

The "Black Regiment" (1778–81)
Black soldiers had been a part of the Continental Army since the first shots at Lexington and Concord in April 1775. The black soldiers in those integrated militias served throughout the war. However, new recruits of black soldiers were technically barred from military service in the Continental Army from November 12, 1775, until February 23, 1778. Even so, many enslavers shirked their duty to serve and sent their enslaved men to serve in their place. As Frederick Mackenzie reported on June 30, 1777, the rebels "find it so difficult to raise men for the Continental Army, that they enlist Negroes, for whom their owners receive a bounty of 180 dollars, and half their pay; and the Negro gets the other half, and a promise of freedom after three years." Rhode Island continued to have difficulties recruiting enough white men to meet the troop quotas set by the Continental Congress in 1778, so the Rhode Island Assembly decided to pursue a suggestion made by General Varnum to enlist enslaved men into the 1st Rhode Island Regiment. Varnum had raised the idea in a letter to George Washington, who forwarded it to the governor of Rhode Island without explicitly approving or disapproving of the plan. On 14 February 1778, the Rhode Island General Assembly voted to allow the enlistment of "every able-bodied negro, mulatto, or Indian man slave" who chose to do so, and voted that "every slave so enlisting shall, upon his passing muster before Colonel Christopher Greene, be immediately discharged from the service of his master or mistress, and be absolutely free." The owners of enslaved men who enlisted were to be compensated by the Assembly in an amount equal to their market value.

A total of 88 enslaved men enlisted in the regiment over the next four months, as well as some free black and native men. The regiment eventually totaled about 225 men; as many as 140 of these were black. The 1st Rhode Island became the only regiment of the Continental Army to have segregated companies of black soldiers; other regiments that allowed black men to enlist were integrated. The enlistment of slaves had been controversial, and no more non-white men were enlisted after June 1778. The unit continued to be known as the "Black Regiment" even though only white men were recruited to replace losses, a process which eventually made it an integrated unit.

Battle of Rhode Island
The regiment fought in the Battle of Rhode Island in August 1778 under the command of Major Samuel Ward Jr., as Colonel Greene had been assigned as a brigade commander for the campaign. It played an important role by defending a redoubt on West Main Road where it successfully repelled three charges by the Hessians.  Repeated attacks from British regulars and Hessian forces failed to break the line of the Patriot forces and allowed the successful withdrawal of Sullivan's army the following night. Historian Sidney Rider notes that the Hessians charged three times and were repulsed each time. According to Rider, the Hessian Colonel "applied to exchange his command and go to New York, because he dared not lead his regiment" into battle again, "lest his men should shoot him for having caused them so much loss." The First Rhode Island suffered three killed, nine wounded, and eleven missing.

After a day of battle, General Sullivan decided that his forces were insufficient and ordered an orderly withdrawal during the night. His soldiers left their camp fires burning to make the British and Hessians think that they were still in place. The operation lasted a total of four hours for six Continental brigades. Sullivan praised the Rhode Island Regiment for its actions, saying that they bore "a proper share of the day's honors." General Lafayette proclaimed the battle as “the best fought action of the war.”

The regiment saw little action over the next three years, since the focus of the war shifted to the south. It remained in Rhode Island to defend against a possible attack by the British forces in Newport, and was later sent to Westchester County in New York where the Continental Army was located.

Rhode Island Regiment (1781–1783)
On 1 January 1781, the regiment was consolidated with the 2nd Rhode Island Regiment at West Point, New York and was re-designated as the Rhode Island Regiment.  The regiment spent the early months of 1781 in an area of the Hudson River Valley called by some historians the "Neutral Zone".

Campaign in the Neutral Zone
The "Neutral Zone" was an area in the Hudson River Valley east of the river described as “a desolate, sparsely populated buffer zone between the forces of the English to the South and the Americans to the North.” People who continued to live in the area had to deal with “theft, murder, and destruction” by renegade groups, such as the “cowboys” or the “skinners.” These renegade groups “cloaked their plundering under an alleged allegiance to one of the combatants.” To whichever side the renegade groups leaned, they would forage for goods to sustain “both men and beasts of burden.”

The constant foraging and raiding in the neutral zone, especially by the British supporting “cowboys,” (loyalist militia) caused Major-General Heath to command Colonel Greene and the Rhode Island Regiment to defend Pine's Bridge on the Croton River from “marauding Cowboys” who frequently made incursions from their base in Morrisiania (South Bronx), under the command of loyalist leader Brigadier General James Delancy.

Battle of Pines Bridge
On the 14 May 1781, Colonel Delancey and his unit of loyalist militia, De Lancey's Refugee Corps, assaulted Pine's Bridge (near present-day Yorktown, New York) and caught Colonel Greene and a small detachment of the Rhode Island Regiment by surprise. Delancey's troops killed Colonel Greene, Major Ebenezer Flagg and eight African-American soldiers of the Rhode Island Regiment. The black troops were reported to have “defended their beloved Col. Greene so well that it was only over their dead bodies that the enemy reached and murdered him.” Greene's body was purportedly mutilated by the Loyalists, as punishment for having led black soldiers against them. Colonel Greene and Major Flagg were buried at the First Presbyterian Church in Yorktown.

Last years
Following the death of Colonel Greene, Lieutenant Colonel Jeremiah Olney took command of the regiment. Under Olney's command, the regiment took part in the Siege of Yorktown in October 1781 which proved to be the last major battle of the Revolution. After Yorktown, the regiment moved with the Main Army to Newburgh, New York where its primary purpose was to be ready to react if British forces in the city went on the offensive.

On January 22, 1783, the regiment was placed under command of Colonel Marinus Willett of the New York Militia, along with other units, to capture Fort Ontario in the town of Oswego, New York on the shore of Lake Ontario.  On February 8, the force of about 500 soldiers, with 120 horse-drawn sleighs, left Fort Herkimer near Utica.  Although the expedition was able to get within a mile of Fort Ontario, the attack was called off at the last minute as the moon was not due to set with enough time before daybreak to make a surprise attack.  After the expedition, the Rhode Island Regiment returned to Newburgh, where it remained for the remainder of its service.

Rhode Island Battalion (1783)
On March 1, 1783, the regiment was reorganized into six companies and designated as the Rhode Island Battalion (a.k.a. "Olney's Rhode Island Battalion"). On June 15, the Rhode Island Regiment veterans with at least 3 years of service were discharged at Saratoga, New York, and the remaining soldiers of the battalion who were enlisted for three years, were organized into a small battalion of two companies. The British evacuated New York on November 25, and the Rhode Island Battalion disbanded on December 25 at Saratoga, New York. It was one of the few units in the Continental Army to have served through the Continental Army's entire existence.

Disbandment

The Rhode Island Regiment served its final days in Saratoga, New York under the command of Brevet Major William Allen. The regiment was left waiting in Saratoga for months, with low supplies and a terrible snowstorm, until Major William Allen and Adjutant Jeremiah Greenman printed the discharge certificates on December 25, 1783. The discharged troops were "dumped back into civilian society," according to one historian, with only the white soldiers being guaranteed 100 acres of bounty land from the federal government, as well as a pension.

The Rhode Island General Assembly had already guaranteed the black soldiers their freedom after the war, and the Rhode Island General Assembly passed an act on February 23, 1784, which forbade "any person born in Rhode Island after March 1, 1784 from being made a slave." The act also stipulated that children born to slaves were to be supported financially by the Rhode Island town in which they were born. During the same meeting, Colonel Olney presented the colors of Rhode Island's Continental Regiment to the General Assembly, and they have been housed in the Rhode Island State House ever since. Olney had promised his men his "interest in their favour," and he continued to advocate for his former troops' right to remain free and to have the government pay them the wages or pensions that they deserved.

In June 1784, 13 black veterans of the Rhode Island Regiment hired Samuel Emory to present their claims for back pay to the War Department Accounts Office, in order to help alleviate the financial difficulties that most black veterans faced after the war. In response, the Rhode Island Assembly passed a special act for these soldiers on February 28, 1785, which called for "the support of paupers, who heretofore were slaves, and enlisted into the Continental battalions." Therefore, any "Indian, negro or mulatto" who was sick or unable to support himself must be taken care of by the town council where he lived.

Some veterans of the Rhode Island Continental Line remained in Rhode Island, although some moved onto the 100 acres of Bounty Land that they were promised in states like New York or Ohio. Most veterans who survived into their 50s or 60s were in desperate poverty because of the economic depression that occurred after the Revolution.

Significant campaigns and battles
Siege of Boston (May 1775 to March 17, 1776)
Battle of Bunker Hill (June 17, 1775)
Battle of Long Island (August 22, 1776)
Battle of Harlem Heights (September 16, 1776)
Battle of White Plains (October 28, 1776)
Battle of Trenton (January 2, 1777)
Battle of Princeton (January 3, 1777)
Battle of Red Bank (October 22, 1777)
Siege of Fort Mifflin (October 23 to November 16, 1777)
Valley Forge (December 19, 1777 to June 19, 1778)
Battle of Rhode Island (August 29, 1778)
Stationed at Bristol, Rhode Island (September 1778)
Winter Quarters in Warren, Rhode Island (December 1778 to Spring 1779)
Aquidneck Island, Rhode Island (October 1779 to January 1781)
Quartered in upstate New York (January 1781 to December 25, 1783)
Battle of Pine's Bridge (May 14, 1781)
Siege and Battle of Yorktown (September 28 to October 19, 1781)
Quartered at Newburgh, New York (1782)
Oswego Expedition (January to February 1783)

Senior officers

Colonels and commanding officers
Colonel James M. Varnum; 3 May 1775 - 27 February 1777 (promoted to brigadier general)
(Colonel Varnum was commissioned as a brigadier general in the Rhode Island state militia on 12 December 1776 and commanded a brigade of Rhode Island state troops serving in Rhode Island until his promotion to brigadier general in the Continental Army on 27 February 1777.)
Lieutenant Colonel Archibald Crary; 12 December 1776 - 27 February 1777 (In temporary command of the regiment pending the exchange of Colonel Greene.)
Colonel Christopher Greene; 27 February 1777 - 14 May 1781 (killed in action)
Lieutenant Colonel Commandant Jeremiah Olney; 14 May 1781 - 25 December 1783 (discharged)

Lieutenant Colonels
James Babcock; 3 May 1775 - 31 December 1775 (discharged)
Archibald Crary; 1 January 1776 - 31 December 1776 (discharged)
(Colonel Crary was appointed lieutenant colonel of Stanton's State Regiment on 12 August 1776.)
Adam Comstock; 1 January 1777 - April 1778 (resigned)
Samuel Ward Jr.; 5 May 1779 (date of rank 26 May 1778) - 31 December 1780 (retired)
Jeremiah Olney; 1 January 1781 - 14 May 1781 (became regimental commander)

Majors
Christopher Greene; 3 May 1775 - 31 December 1775 (taken prisoner and not exchanged until August 1776)
Christopher Smith; 1 January 1776 - 27 October 1776 (transferred to 2nd Rhode Island Regiment)
Henry Sherburne; 28 October 1776 - 11 January 1777 (promoted to colonel)
Samuel Ward Jr.; 12 January 1777 - 26 May 1778 (promoted to lieutenant colonel)
Silas Talbot; 10 October 1777 (date of rank 1 September 1777) - 12 November 1778 (promoted to lieutenant colonel)
Ebenezer Flagg; 5 May 1779 (date of rank 26 May 1778) - 14 May 1781 (killed in action)
Coggeshall Olney; 25 August 1781 (date of rank 14 May 1781) - 17 March 1783 (resigned)
John S. Dexter; 25 August 1781 (date of rank 14 May 1781) - 3 November 1783 (discharged)

Men of color

Privates 

 Prince Greene, 7 May 1777 - 28 June 1783

Legacy

There is a monument to the 1st Rhode Island Regiment at Patriots Park in Portsmouth, Rhode Island on the site of the Battle of Rhode Island. This monument lists names, maps and details of all who fought in the Battle of Rhode Island. The 1st RI regimental flag is preserved at the Rhode Island State House in Providence.

Colonel Greene and Major Flagg are buried at the First Presbyterian Church in Yorktown, New York where there is a large monument in their honor, about two miles north of the site of their deaths. There is also a Monument to First Rhode Island Regiment made of stone next to Greene's marker to honor the black soldiers who died defending him; this memorial was added to the African American Heritage Trail of Westchester County in 2004.

See also
James M. Varnum
Christopher Greene
Jeremiah Olney
Prince Greene
2nd Rhode Island Regiment
Sherburne's Additional Continental Regiment
Richmond's Regiment
Babcock's/Lippitt's Regiment

Notes

References
 380813416 
 
 Dearden, Paul F. The Rhode Island Campaign of 1778: Inauspicious Dawn of Alliance. Providence: The Rhode Island Publications Society, 1980.
Lanning, Michael Lee. African Americans in the Revolutionary War. New York: Citadel Press, 2005.
Lengel, Edward G. General George Washington: A Military Life. New York: Random House, 2005. .
 
 "Rhode Island Units in the Revolutionary War." Rhodeislandsar.org. N.p., n.d. Web.
 
Wright, Robert K. The Continental Army. Washington, D.C.: Center of Military History, U.S. Army, 1983. Available, in part, online from the U.S. Army website.

Further reading

 
 Greene, Lorenzo J. "Some Observations on the Black Regiment of Rhode Island in the American Revolution." The Journal of Negro History, Vol. 37, No. 2, April 1952
 Popek, Daniel M.  They '...fought bravely, but were unfortunate:' The True Story of Rhode Island's 'Black Regiment' and the Failure of Segregation in Rhode Island's Continental Line, 1777-1783, AuthorHouse, November 2015.
 Geake, Robert. 1st Rhode Island Regiment. Westholme Publishing, 2016. 
 Rees, John U. "''They were good soldiers.": African Americans in the Continental Army, and General Glover's Soldier-Servants." Military Collector & Historian 62, no. 2 (Summer2010 2010): 139–142. America: History & Life, EBSCOhost.

Military units and formations established in 1775
Military units and formations disestablished in 1783
African-American history of Rhode Island
African-American history of the United States military
Rhode Island regiments of the Continental Army
Military emancipation in the American Revolutionary War